The women's discus throw at the 2021 World Athletics U20 Championships was held at the Kasarani Stadium on 20 August.

Records

Results

Final
The final was held on 20 August at 11:26.

References

discus throw
Discus throw at the World Athletics U20 Championships
U20